The Metro Theater is a New York City movie theater, located on the Upper West Side of Manhattan at 2626 Broadway between 99th and 100th Streets. An example of Art Deco architecture of New York City, it opened in 1933 and closed in 2005.

Architecture 

In 1931 Architects Boak & Paris designed the Art Deco Midtown (now Metro) Theater at 2626 Broadway between 99th and 100th Streets. The developer was A.C. and H.M. Hall. Similar to the Variety Theater, Boak & Paris used lights on the underside of the marquee. The terra-cotta wall in its facade above the marquee was described in the report designating it a landmark as "The most notable feature of the theater’s facade". The central part of the marquee features a polychromed medallion depicting the figures of comedy and tragedy.

The interior of the single screen Midtown had niches on either side of the screen containing statues of nude women holding glowing dishes.

History 

The Midtown opened in 1933. From its opening until the 1950s, the theater presented first-run films. In the 1950s and 1960s, it presented art-house films by directors such as Jean-Luc Godard, Louis Buñuel and Roman Polanski.

In the 1970s and 80s it operated as a porn theater. 

In 1982, Dan Talbot acquired the lease to the theater. 

In 1989, New York City Landmarks Preservation Commission (LPC) designated the Midtown (now Metro) an individual landmark. The theater is Boak & Paris' only individually landmarked building.

The Metro was managed by Clearview Cinemas until it closed in 2003. Peter H. Elson then leased the theater from Albert Bialek, operating the theater as Embassy's New Metro Twin until it closed again in 2005.

The following year, in 2006, the interior of the theater was gutted. This was permitted because only the exterior was protected by landmarking. In 2007 David Dunlap wrote in the New York Times that "...the inside, visible to passers-by on a recent afternoon, has been gutted. Gone are seats and plaster and curtains and screen. Gone is a golden ceiling molding with a chain of floral bouquets. Gone are the sylph-filled niches. Gone is grille work that sprouted like corn stalks."

In 2009 Dunlap wrote that "When we left our story more than a year ago, the fate of the Art Deco jewel box known as the Metro Theater was up in the air. Though the building’s exterior is one of the most recognizable landmarks on upper Broadway, its interior—no longer usable as a cinema—had been gutted and no one could say for sure what kind of tenant might make use of such an idiosyncratic space, though the Winick Realty Group was searching."

In 2011, Julie Satow reported in the New York Times that "... the longtime owner, Albert Bialek, wrested control of the Metro, an Art Deco landmark, after a protracted legal battle with the leaseholder, John R. Souto. Mr. Souto, whose firm filed for bankruptcy protection last year, had a 49-year lease with an option to buy the property, but defaulted on the terms, Mr. Bialek said. New York City marshals evicted him from the property in January."

In 2015,The New York Times reported that the theater would be transformed into a gym.

In 2016, the West Side Rag reported that "The Texas theater chain Alamo Drafthouse attempted to revive it, but gave up as construction costs rose.":

In 2021 the UWS Patch reported: "Storefront vacancy on the Upper West Side has been a long-growing issue in the community, and there may be no greater symbol of the neighborhood's vacancy blight than the shuttered Metro Theater."

In popular culture
The Metro appeared in the Woody Allen film, Hannah and Her Sisters in 1986.

The Metro appears in a video for Janet Jackson's 1987 release, "Let's Wait Awhile".

References 

New York City Designated Landmarks in Manhattan
Broadway (Manhattan)
Theatres in Manhattan
1933 establishments in New York (state)
Theatres completed in 1933
Art Deco architecture in Manhattan